Alexandra Munroe, Ph.D., is a curator, Asia scholar, and author focusing on art, culture, and institutional global strategy. She has produced over 40 exhibitions and published pioneering scholarship on modern and contemporary Asian art. She organized the first major North American retrospectives of artists Yayoi Kusama (1989), Daido Moriyama (1999), Yoko Ono (2000), Mu Xin (2001), Cai Guo-Qiang (2008), and Lee Ufan (2011), among others, and has brought such historic avant-garde movements as Gutai, Mono-ha, and Chinese conceptual art, as well as Japanese otaku culture, to international attention. Her project Japanese Art after 1945: Scream Against the Sky (1994) is recognized for initiating the field of postwar Japanese art history in North America. Recently, Munroe was lead curator of the Guggenheim’s exhibition, Art and China after 1989: Theater of the World (co-organized with Philip Tinari and Hou Hanru), which the New York Times named as one of 2017’s top ten exhibitions and ARTnews named as one of the decade’s top 25 most influential shows. Credited for the far-reaching impact of her exhibitions and scholarship bolstering knowledge of postwar Japanese art history in America and Japan, she received the 2017 Japan Foundation Award and the 2018 Commissioner for Cultural Affairs Award, both bestowed by the government of Japan.

An authority on modern and contemporary Asian art and transnational art studies, Munroe is Senior Curator and Director, Curatorial Affairs, Guggenheim Abu Dhabi and Senior Curator, Asian Art and Senior Advisor, Global Arts, at the Solomon R. Guggenheim Museum and Foundation, New York, positions created for her since she joined the museum in 2006. Under her leadership, the Guggenheim has expanded its mission to broadening the geographical scope of its programs through the study, acquisition, and exhibition of art from non-Western regions. As director of curatorial affairs for the Guggenheim Abu Dhabi Project, she leads a team based in New York and Abu Dhabi charged with shaping its curatorial vision, building a collection of global art spanning the 1960s to the present, and developing and implementing the program that will establish Guggenheim Abu Dhabi as the preeminent modern and contemporary art museum in the region and beyond. She also founded and presides over the Guggenheim’s Asian Art Council, a curatorial think tank.

Education and travels
Munroe was born in New York City in 1958 and raised in Mexico and in Ashiya, Japan. She attended Brown University for two years and later received a bachelor of arts in Japanese Language and Culture from Sophia University (上智大学) in Tokyo in 1982. She was awarded a master's degree in art history from the New York University Institute of Fine Arts, and in 2004, a Ph.D. in history from New York University. She studied under Harry Harootunian and wrote her thesis on postwar Japanese art and politics.

Prior to her academic training, Munroe served as a resident lay disciple at Yotokuin, a subtemple of Daitoku-ji (大徳寺) monastic compound in Kyoto, a historic center of Rinzai Zen from 1977 to 1980. She practiced chanoyu with masters of the Urasenke (裏千家) school of tea and shimai with a master in the Hōshō (宝生) school of Noh theater. Munroe is fluent in Japanese.

Curatorial work and scholarship
Munroe's survey exhibition Japanese Art After 1945: Scream Against the Sky (1994–95) initiated the academic and curatorial field of postwar Japanese art history in the United States.  Munroe organized the first retrospectives in America of several Asian-born artists, including Yayoi Kusama: A Retrospective (Center for International Contemporary Arts, New York, 1989); YES Yoko Ono (Japan Society Gallery, New York, 2000; traveled to 13 venues in U.S., Canada, Japan, and Korea through 2003); Cai Guo Qiang: I Want to Believe (Solomon R. Guggenheim Museum, 2008); and Lee Ufan: Marking Infinity (Solomon R. Guggenheim Museum, 2011).The Third Mind: American Artists Contemplate Asia, 1860–1989 (Solomon R. Guggenheim Museum, 2009) was among the largest exhibitions of Asian influence on American culture to date and received the inaugural Chairman's Special Award of $1,000,000 from the National Endowment for the Humanities. In 2017, Munroe was the lead curator of the Guggenheim's exhibition, Art and China after 1989: Theater of the World, which The New York Times named among the Top 10 art exhibitions of 2017.

Museum career 
As Samsung Senior Curator of Asian Art at the Solomon R. Guggenheim Museum, Munroe spearheads the museum's Asian Art Initiative, expanding the institution's mission to study, acquire, and exhibit art from beyond the Western world. In this role, she guides the Solomon R. Guggenheim Foundation's exhibitions, acquisitions, and public programs relating to Asian art for its museums worldwide. As a member of the Curatorial Working Group for the Guggenheim Abu Dhabi, she helps shape the future museum's collection. Munroe has also organized and maintains the Asian Art Council, an advisory group composed of global art curators.

Under Munroe's direction, the Guggenheim launched The Robert H. N. Ho Family Foundation Chinese Art Initiative in 2013 with a $10 million grant to study, present, and acquire contemporary art from China.

Prior to the Guggenheim, Munroe was an independent curator based in New York and Tokyo before, in 1998, becoming Director of Japan Society Gallery, and later, Vice President of Arts and Culture at Japan Society, an American organization dedicated to cultural and policy exchange between Japan and the United States. During her seven-year tenure, the society's contemporary art programs grew in size and stature through such exhibitions as YES Yoko Ono (2000) and the Takashi Murakami–curated Little Boy: The Arts of Japan’s Exploding Subcultures (2005). Both shows set record attendance for the institution.
Munroe also curated the society's first inter-Asia loan exhibition, Transmitting the Forms of Divinity: Early Buddhist Art from Korea and Japan (2003) that was co-organized by the Japan Society; Korea Society, New York; Gyeongju National Museum, Korea; and Nara National Museum, Japan.

Awards and honors 
Munroe's exhibitions and publications have been recognized by numerous awards.  The International Association of Art Critics (AICA-USA) has cited four of her exhibitions: YES YOKO ONO (First Prize, Best Museum Show Originating in New York, 2001), Little Boy: The Arts of Japan’s Exploding Subculture, shared with Takashi Murakami (First Prize, Best Thematic Museum Show in New York, 2006),  Third Mind: American Artists Contemplate Asia, 1860–1989 (First Prize, Best Thematic Museum Show in New York, 2010), and Gutai: Splendid Playground (shared with Ming Tiampo, First Prize, Best Thematic Museum Show in New York, 2014).

In 2012, the American Alliance of Museums conferred an Honorable Mention in the Publications Competition on Lee Ufan: Marking Infinity. Likewise, in 2009, the Association of American Museum Curators awarded The Third Mind: American Artists Contemporary Asia, 1860–1989 an Honorable Mention for Outstanding Exhibition Catalogue.

In 2009, the catalogue for Cai Guo-Qiang: I Want to Believe took First Place for 30th George Wittenborn Memorial Book Award, presented by the Art Libraries Society of North America, and in 2008–09, China Art Powers named the exhibition the Best Show in China. In 1996, the catalogue Japanese Art after 1945: Scream Against the Sky was a finalist for the Alfred H. Barr Jr. Award for Outstanding Scholarship in a Publication, awarded by the College Art Association.

Philanthropy and activism 
In April 2011, she spearheaded the Solomon R. Guggenheim Foundation’s petition calling for the release of Chinese dissident artist Ai Weiwei. With broad support from the International Council on Museums (ICOM), AAMD, and PEN America, the petition garnered over 145,000 signatures worldwide on the activist website Change.org. In response to the COVID-19 pandemic, Munroe worked with Ai as curator of Ai Weiwei MASK. Launched in May 2020, this project offered face coverings hand-printed with iconic images of the artist’s lifelong campaign for free speech and individual rights. Ai donated the artworks to be sold exclusively through eBay for Charity to benefit the COVID-19 emergency humanitarian efforts led by non-governmental organizations.

Munroe is a trustee of the American Academy in Rome, Aspen Music Festival and School, Intelligence Squared US, LongHouse Reserve, and PEN America. She is a member of the Council on Foreign Relations and is a former member of the Association of Art Museum Directors (AAMD). She serves on the advisory boards of several organizations, including Asia Art Archive, Hong Kong; Jnanapravaha Mumbai; MAXXI, National Museum of 21st Century Art, Rome; and Rockbund Art Museum, Shanghai. She sits on the Visiting Committee of the Thomas J. Watson Library at the Metropolitan Museum of Art, New York.

Munroe has lectured widely at museums and academic conferences, including appearances at Harvard, Yale, Princeton, and Columbia universities; Culture Summit Abu Dhabi; School of Oriental and Asian Studies (SOAS), University of London; the Central Academy of Fine Arts (CAFA), Beijing; and the International Research Center for Japanese Studies, Kyoto, one of Japan’s National Institutes for the Humanities.

Publications

Notes

External links
Guggenheim Museum Curator Profile
Complete List of Munroe's Works
Alexandra Munroe Website
Rosenkranz Foundation Director Biography
Intelligence Squared U.S. Co-Founder

1957 births
Living people
American art historians
Women art historians
American art curators
American women curators
Brown University alumni
Writers from New York City
Sophia University alumni
New York University Institute of Fine Arts alumni
Historians from New York (state)
21st-century American women